Wilfrid Laurier University is a public university located in Waterloo, Ontario, Canada, and was founded in 1911 as the Evangelical Lutheran Seminary of Canada and later Waterloo Lutheran University. It was renamed Wilfrid Laurier University in 1973 by the Government of Ontario under the Wilfrid Laurier University Act in 1973. The school is one of the fastest-growing universities in Canada; its enrollment doubled from 2002 to 2007, and it has 12,000 full-time undergraduate students as of 2008. Wilfrid Laurier University also has two satellite campuses in Brantford and Kitchener, both in Ontario.

People associated with Wilfrid Laurier University include faculty, alumni, staff, honorary degree recipients, chancellors, and presidents. The university has had nine chancellors, including the incumbent Michael Lee-Chin. Wilfrid Laurier University has had seven presidents, including the incumbent Deborah MacLatchy, who has served in this position since 1 July, 2017.

Alumni and faculty
Fields with a — have unknown values.

Alumni

Sam Schachter (born 1990), Olympic volleyball player
{Karl W Schweizer;1966-69;Author and Historian}

Faculty

Honorary degree recipients
DDiv – Doctor of Divinity; DLitt – Doctor of Letters; LLD – Doctor of Laws

Administration

Chancellors
Wilfrid Laurier University has had eleven chancellors.

Presidents
Wilfrid Laurier University has had eight presidents.

References
General

 

Specific

External links
Official site of Wilfrid Laurier University

People
Wilfrid Laurier University
Wilfrid Laurier University